Decipifus is a genus of sea snails, marine gastropod mollusks in the family Columbellidae, the dove snails.

Species
Species within the genus Decipifus include:
 Decipifus algoensis (Thiele, 1925)
 Decipifus cingulatus (Lussi, 2009)
 Decipifus consanguineus (G.B. Sowerby III, 1897)
 Decipifus dictynna Dall, 1919
 Decipifus gracilis McLean, 1959
 Decipifus kristenseni De Jong & Coomans, 1988
 Decipifus lyrta (Baker, Hanna & Strong, 1938)
 Decipifus macleani Keen, 1971
 Decipifus metellus (Thiele, 1925)
 Decipifus serratus (Carpenter, 1857)
 Decipifus sixaolus Olsson & McGinty, 1958

References

Columbellidae